The Detective and Death is a 1994 Spanish thriller film directed by Gonzalo Suárez.

Plot 
Loosely based on Hans Christian Andersen's "The Story of a Mother", it is set in a fictional European city stirred by racial conflicts (in lieu of the forest from the short story).

Cast

Production 
Produced by LolaFilms and Ditirambo Films, it was shot in between Llanes and Warsaw.

Release 
The film was presented at the San Sebastián International Film Festival in September 1994. It was theatrically released on 30 September 1994.

Reception 
David Rooney of Variety assessed that despite the bizarre meeting between film noir and gruesome fairy tale featuring "commanding perfs and arresting visuals", the helmer "encumbers the lugubrious thriller with pretentious hokum".

Accolades 

|-
| align = "center" | 1994 || 42nd San Sebastián International Film Festival || Silver Shell for Best Actor || Javier Bardem ||  || 
|-
| align = "center" rowspan = "7" | 1995 || rowspan = "5" | 9th Goya Awards || Best Original Screenplay || Gonzalo Suárez ||  || rowspan = "5" | 
|-
| Best Production Supervision || José Luis García Arrojo || 
|-
| Best Original Score || Suso Saiz || 
|-
| Best Editing || José Salcedo || 
|-
| Best Special Effects || Miroslaw Marchwinski ||  
|-
| 45th Fotogramas de Plata || Best Actor || Carmelo Gómez ||  || 
|-
| 50th CEC Awards || Best Cinematography || Carlos Suárez ||  || 
|}

See also 
 List of Spanish films of 1994

References

External links

1994 films
Spanish thriller films
1990s Spanish-language films
Films set in Europe
Films shot in Asturias
Films shot in Warsaw
1990s Spanish films
Films directed by Gonzalo Suárez
Films based on works by Hans Christian Andersen
Spanish neo-noir films